Henrik Jonzon (born 15 April 1979) is a Swedish platinum record selling songwriter, producer, musician, and artist. He was born and grew up in Chicago. His music combines indie pop rock with urban, R&B and mainstream pop.

From 2013 Jonzon has been writing music for and collaborating with Zara Larsson, Paloma Faith, Elias, Rebecca & Fiona, Erik Rapp, Sabina Ddumba, Mando Diao and Naomi Pilgrim.

Jonzon is also the lead singer and songwriter of the Swedish indie pop band Nervous Nellie.

Production and writing

Discography

Discography

Nervous Nellie

Albums
 Don't Think Feel (2005)
 Ego 6 the Id (2008)
 Why Dawn Is Called Mourning (2010)
 Where the Nightmare Gets In (2012)

Extended plays
Gloves EP (2014)

Singles
 "Don't Think Feel" (2010)
 "Skeletons" (2013)
 "Shoulder" (2014)

References

Swedish record producers
Living people
1970 births